"Breakaway" (spelled "Break-a-Way" on the original 45 RPM label, but usually spelled "Breakaway" on most subsequent releases and compilations) is a song written by Jackie DeShannon and Sharon Sheeley.  It was originally recorded by Irma Thomas in 1964 and released as the B-side of her biggest hit, the US No. 17 single "Wish Someone Would Care". A demo version performed by DeShannon was also recorded but remained unreleased until a 1994 compilation.

The original version of "Breakaway" was never a hit, not making the Billboard Hot 100. Nevertheless, "Breakaway" is today generally a better-remembered song than the A-side of Thomas' record, which might be partly due to Tracey Ullman's 1980s hit cover.  It has become a staple in Thomas' live performances and appears on several recent Irma Thomas and "New Orleans music" compilations.

"Breakaway" was Tracey Ullman's 1983 debut single in the UK, and reached No. 4 on the UK Singles Chart.  The track then appeared on Ullman's album You Broke My Heart in 17 Places, which was released in 1984.

In North America, "Breakaway" was actually Ullman's second single, being released after her hit "They Don't Know".  It charted at No. 70 in the US in 1984, although the video for Ullman's version received significant play on the then-fledgling MTV and Canada's MuchMusic.

The song's lyrics speak of the singer's inability to find the strength to leave a relationship, and describe a situation where the song's first person protagonist is repeatedly on the verge of running away from the bad situation, only to find at the last moment she does not have the strength of will to follow through.

Other versions
British singer Beryl Marsden recorded a cover version of this song in 1965, for Columbia Records.

In 2010, a version of the song by the Detroit Cobras was used in commercials for the NFL RedZone channel.

References

External links
Article from OffBeat Magazine
Bio from "Soul Express"
Bio with song origin and inspiration

Tracey Ullman songs
1964 singles
1983 debut singles
Irma Thomas songs
Songs written by Jackie DeShannon
Jackie DeShannon songs
Songs written by Sharon Sheeley
1964 songs
Stiff Records singles
Imperial Records singles